Tomina is a province in the Chuquisaca Department in Bolivia. Its seat is Padilla.

Geography 
Some of the highest mountains of the province are listed below:

Subdivisions 

Tomina Province is divided into five municipalities which are partly further subdivided into cantons.

The people 
The people are predominantly indigenous citizens of Quechuan descent.

Ref.: obd.descentralizacion.gov.bo

Languages 
The languages spoken in the province are mainly Spanish and Quechua.

Tourist attractions 
Padilla Municipality is situated within the Iñao National Park and Integrated Management Natural Area.

See also 
 Manuel Ascencio Padilla

References 

Provinces of Chuquisaca Department